Toledo is a small city in the Canelones Department of Uruguay. Together with Villa Crespo y San Andrés, it forms a population centre of more than 14,000, which is also generally known as "Toledo", although the censual area of Toledo itself has only about 4,400 inhabitants, according to the 2011 census. They are both part of the wider metropitan area of Montevideo.

Toledo is also the name of the municipality to which the city belongs and includes Villa Crespo y San Andrés as well as several other urban centres of the area.

Geography

Location
The city is located on Km. 22 of Route 6 and on its intersection with Route 85. The stream Arroyo de Toledo flows along the west and the south limits of the town.

History 
The town was founded on November 17, 1889. On 28 May 1928 it was declared a "Pueblo" (village) by the Act of Ley  Nº 8.224, while on 24 October 1995, its status was elevated to "Ciudad" (city) by the Act of Ley Nº 16.721.

Population 
In 2011 Toledo had a population of 4,397. The Intendencia de Canelones has estimated a population of 16,197 for the municipality.

 
Source: Instituto Nacional de Estadística de Uruguay

Places of worship
 Parish Church of Our Lady of Mt. Carmel (Roman Catholic)
 Former Archdiocesan Seminary (since 1969, a military facility), a national landmark by Architect Mario Payssé Reyes

Government
The city mayor as of July 2010 is Álvaro Gómez.

Notable people
 José Giménez (born 1995), footballer.

References

External links 
INE map of Villa Crespo y San Andrés, Toledo, Fracc.Camino del Andaluz y R.84, Joaquín Suárez, Fracc.sobre Ruta 74, Villa San José, Villa San Felipe, Villa Hadita, Seis Hermanos and Villa Porvenir

Populated places in the Canelones Department
Populated places established in 1889